Groton High School, officially Groton Junior/Senior High School, is the only high school in the Groton Central School District. It serves the Village and Town of Groton, Tompkins County, New York, and extending into areas of Cortland and Cayuga Counties. Its previous building is now listed on the National Register of Historic Places.

Notable alumni
Ann Cody, three-time U.S. Paralympian and disability rights advocate
Julian B. Erway, lawyer and politician who served several terms in the New York State Senate

References

Public high schools in New York (state)
Schools in Tompkins County, New York